Step Across the Border is a 1990 avant-garde documentary film on English guitarist, composer and improviser Fred Frith. It was written and directed by Nicolas Humbert and Werner Penzel and released in Germany and Switzerland. The film was screened in cinemas in North America, South America, Europe and Japan, and on television in the United States, Germany, Switzerland, Austria and France. It was also released on VHS by RecRec Music (Switzerland) in 1990, and was later released on DVD by Winter & Winter Records (Germany) in 2003.

Shot in black and white, the 35mm documentary was filmed between 1988 and 1990 in Japan, Italy, France, Germany, England, the United States and Switzerland, and shows Frith rehearsing, performing, giving interviews and relaxing. Other musicians featured include René Lussier, Iva Bittová, Tom Cora, Tim Hodgkinson, Bob Ostertag and John Zorn.

The film won a "Special Mention" at the European Film Award for Best Documentary in 1990. A companion soundtrack album, Step Across the Border was also released by RecRec Music in 1990.

In January 2020 Cut Up the Border was released on CD by RogueArt. It is a sound collage created by Humbert and French sound designer, Marc Parisotto from over thirty hours of audio tape that were not used in the film.

Description
Step Across the Border is subtitled:
A ninety minute celluloid improvisation by Nicolas Humbert and Werner Penzel.
"Improvisation" here refers not only to the music, but also to the film itself. Humbert and Penzel state in the 2003 DVD release of the film:

The film is not narrated, and the musicians, the music and the locations are not identified. Instead it is a sequence of "snapshots" taken of Frith and musicians he has worked with, rehearsing and performing, interspersed with apparent random images of movement (trains, cars, people, grass) that blend in with the music. The improvised nature of the film and its Direct Cinema approach make it more of an art film than simply a documentary on a musician.

The music in the film is performed by Frith on his own, with others, and by others on their own. Some of the music is improvised, some is composed material performed "live", and some is previously recorded material played as accompaniment to many of the "movement" sequences in the film.

The recording of the film coincided with the formation and activity of Frith's review band Keep the Dog (1989–1991), and many of the participants of the band appear in the film. There are even a few rare glimpses of the band rehearsing. René Lussier in particular, features prominently and "interviews" Frith about his musical upbringing and approach to music.

The title of the film comes from the lyrics of the song "The Border", recorded by Skeleton Crew on their album, The Country of Blinds (1986). A brief "video" of this song also appears in the film.

Musicians
Musicians appearing in the film include:
Fred Frith
René Lussier
Jean Derome
Kevin Norton
Bob Ostertag
Haco
Iva Bittová
Pavel Fajt
Tom Cora
Tim Hodgkinson
John Zorn
Eitetsu Hayashi
Joey Baron
Cyro Baptista
Arto Lindsay

Additional cast
Jonas Mekas – narrator on "The Butterfly Wing Effect"
Julia Judge – narrator on "The Sound of One Hand Clapping"
John Spaceley – narrator on "The Sound of One Hand Clapping"
Tom Walker – narrator on "The Sound of One Hand Clapping"
Ted Milton – television dancer on "The Border"
Robert Frank – old man in train

Film locations
Japan
Tokyo, Osaka, Kyoto
Italy
Verona
France
Saint-Rémy-de-Provence
Germany
Leipzig
England
London, Yorkshire
United States
New York City
Switzerland
Zurich, Bern

Reception
In a review in The Boston Globe, Betsy Sherman said Step Across the Border is "a tribute to the doggedly creative spirit of those who swim against the tide of commercialized pop culture." She called Frith "an engaging subject" and a "happy pilgrim, open to inspiration and discovery". Writing in the Los Angeles Times, John Henken felt that the film's "cinematic posturing" is "at odds with Frith's pretention-free music", but added that the ambient travel-sounds have their "own voice", and blend in well with the film's "Frithian aesthetic". Henken found the final third of the documentary "compelling" and "poignant".

Reviewing the film in the San Francisco Examiner, Scott Rosenberg said Frith is "simply a guy who loves the sound of an electric guitar", and while the sounds he produces may seem a "racket ... it's a beguiling one". But he was disappointed with the filmmaker's "celluloid improvisation" where the camera appears to "wander aimlessly". Rosenberg felt that the documentary "degenerate[s] into despondent randomness" instead of focusing on Frith and his playing. "Aurally, Frith achieves something more than bare noise – but Humbert and Penzel have created cacophony's visual analog."

Awards

In 2000 the film was chosen as one of the 100 most important movies in film-history by critics of Cahiers du cinéma, Paris

Home media release
In 2003, Winter & Winter Records (Germany) released Step Across the Border on DVD. It contained a slightly shortened version of the original film, plus 12 "bonus tracks" and a trailer of Middle of the Moment, another documentary film by Nicolas Humbert and Werner Penzel, with music by Fred Frith (released on the soundtrack, Middle of the Moment).

A few segments totalling about seven minutes were removed from the original film, including the "video" of the song "The Border" by Skeleton Crew, and Keep the Dog rehearsing "Norrgården Nyvla".

Bonus tracks 
The "bonus tracks" are outtakes and many feature additional shots of scenes in the film.
John Dee Holeman – Gromes Hotel, New York City, February 1989
Charles Hayward – Rehearsal room backyard, Leipzig, October 1988
Arto Lindsay – Rehearsal room, Leipzig, October 1988
Fred Frith – Selluloid Restaurant, Osaka, January 1988
Fred Frith and Tom Cora – Rehearsal at The Kitchen, New York City, February 1989
Fred Frith, René Lussier, Jean Derome and Kevin Norton – Rehearsal at The Roulette, New York City, February 1989
Cyro Baptista – Reheasal room, New York City, February 1989
Fred Frith and John Zorn – Rehearsal at The Kitchen, New York City, February 1989
Fred Frith and Tim Hodgkinson – Rehearsal at Hodgkinson's house, Brixton, London, December 1988
Fred Frith – Concert at the Muse, Osaka, January 1988
Fred Frith – Frith's apartment (recalling some of his compositions), New York City, January 1989
Joey Baron – Baron's house, Hoboken, New Jersey, January 1989

Soundtrack

Cut Up the Border

Some thirty years after Step Across the Border was released, director Humbert reviewed over thirty hours of audio tape that were not used in the film. Humbert and French sound designer, Marc Parisotto used these tapes to create a sound collage of ambient noise and performances by Frith, Cora, Ted Milton, Bittová, Haco and Zorn. The result was presented at a Berlin cinema in January 2019 with Frith improvising live on guitar over the sound piece. The performance was recorded and broadcast by Deutschlandfunk in February 2019. In January 2020, RogueArt released the radio broadcast on CD entitled Cut Up the Border and credited to Fred Frith, Nicolas Humbert and Marc Parisotto.

References

Works cited
Nicolas Humbert and Werner Penzel, Step Across the Border (VHS, RecRec Music, 1990)
Nicolas Humbert and Werner Penzel, Step Across the Border (DVD, Winter & Winter Records, 2003)

External links
Step Across the Border at artfilm.ch
 

1990 films
1990 documentary films
Documentary films about music and musicians
Fred Frith
1990s English-language films